The 1984 Budweiser GT 1000 Kilometers was the sixth round of the 1984 World Endurance Championship.  It took place at Mosport Park, Canada on 5 August 1984.

Several World Championship competitors opted not to participate in the Mosport round, including all B class entries.  Three GTO class cars from the IMSA GT Championship chose to enter the round.

Official results
Class winners in bold.  Cars failing to complete 75% of the winner's distance marked as Not Classified (NC).

Statistics 
 Pole Position - #2 Rothmans Porsche - 1:12.107
 Fastest Lap - #2 Rothmans Porsche - 1:13.874
 Average Speed -

References 

 
 

Mosport
Mosport
Grand Prix of Mosport
1984 in Ontario